Milton Coimbra Sulzer (born May 4, 1975, in Santa Cruz de la Sierra) is a Bolivian retired football striker. He was a journeyman footballer playing for nine clubs in seven countries.

Club career
Nicknamed "Buffalo", his career began with Oriente Petrolero, where he played from 1995 to 2002 with a short interval at the Argentine club Lanús. Coimbra then went to Mexico, where he played for Puebla F.C. (2002–2003) and Correcaminos UAT (2004), before moving to Ras Al Khaima in the United Arab Emirates (2004), then to the Greek team Ionikos (2005) and later to the Chinese side Beijing Guoan (2006). During early 2007, he joined the Chilean club O'Higgins along with fellow countryman José Alfredo Castillo, but after a few games he returned to Oriente for the remainder of the year. In 2008, he was loaned to Guabirá. The team was relegated to the second division and he left after the season came to an end. During his fourth spell with Oriente during the 2009 Apertura tournament, Coimbra surprisingly announced his withdrawal from professional football at the age of 34.

International career
He played for the Bolivia national team between 1996 and 2005, scoring 7 goals in 43 games. He represented his country in 17 FIFA World Cup qualification matches.

References

External links
 Argentine Primera statistics at Fútbol XXI  
 
 Statistics at BoliviaGol.com 
 
 

1975 births
Living people
Sportspeople from Santa Cruz de la Sierra
Association football forwards
Bolivian footballers
Bolivia international footballers
1997 Copa América players
1999 Copa América players
2001 Copa América players
Oriente Petrolero players
Club Atlético Lanús footballers
Club Puebla players
Correcaminos UAT footballers
Ionikos F.C. players
Beijing Guoan F.C. players
O'Higgins F.C. footballers
Guabirá players
Bolivian Primera División players
Argentine Primera División players
Liga MX players
Super League Greece players
Chinese Super League players
Chilean Primera División players
Bolivian expatriate footballers
Expatriate footballers in Argentina
Expatriate footballers in Mexico
Expatriate footballers in the United Arab Emirates
Expatriate footballers in Greece
Expatriate footballers in China
Expatriate footballers in Chile